José Manuel González Ortiz (born 29 January 1979), known as Cheli, is a Spanish retired footballer who played as a midfielder.

Football career
Cheli was born in Lepe, Province of Huelva. After emerging through the ranks of local Recreativo de Huelva he played eight seasons with the first team, experiencing two La Liga promotions with the Andalusians; he was also loaned twice, on both occasions to third division sides.

In 2006–07, Cheli made his top level debuts, his first appearance being in a 1–1 home draw against RCD Mallorca on 27 August 2006. Scarcely used throughout the campaign he still scored two goals, in large wins over Galicia's Celta de Vigo (4–2) and Deportivo de La Coruña (5–2).

Cheli joined Recreativo neighbours Málaga CF for 2007–08, appearing regularly – both as starter or from the bench – to help the club return to the top flight. In the following season, however, he was very rarely played, being released at its closure and joining UE Lleida in division three.

References

External links

1979 births
Living people
Sportspeople from the Province of Huelva
Spanish footballers
Footballers from Andalusia
Association football midfielders
La Liga players
Segunda División players
Segunda División B players
Tercera División players
Atlético Onubense players
CD San Roque de Lepe footballers
Recreativo de Huelva players
Real Jaén footballers
CD Badajoz players
Málaga CF players
UE Lleida players